Swing or swinging may refer to:

Apparatus
 Swing (seat), a hanging seat that swings back and forth
 Pendulum, an object that swings
 Russian swing, a swing-like circus apparatus
 Sex swing, a type of harness for sexual intercourse
 Swing ride, an amusement park ride consisting of suspended seats that rotate like a merry-go-round

Arts, entertainment, and media

Films
 Swing (1938 film), an American film directed by Oscar Micheaux
 Swing (1999 film), an American film by Nick Mead
 Swing (2002 film), a French film by Tony Gatlif
 Swing (2003 film), an American film by Martin Guigui
 Swing (2010 film), a Hindi short film
 Swing (2021 film), an American film by Michael Mailer

Music

Styles
 Swing (jazz performance style), the sense of propulsive rhythmic "feel" or "groove" in jazz
 Swing music, a style of jazz popular during the 1930s–1950s

Groups and labels
 Swing (Canadian band), a Canadian néo-trad band
 Swing (Hong Kong band), a Hong Kong pop music group
 Swing Time Records, a record label

Albums 
 The Swing (INXS album), a 1984 album by Australian rock band INXS
 Swing (The Manhattan Transfer album), 1997 album by The Manhattan Transfer
 Swing, a 2009 album by Christian De Sica
 Swing (Renée Geyer album), 2013 album by Renée Geyer
 Swing (EP), a 2014 album by South Korean-Chinese group, Super Junior-M

Songs 
 "Swing" (Trace Adkins song), 2006, by Trace Adkins
 "Swing" (AMO song), a 2012 song by Slovak hip hop band AMO
 "Swing" (Savage song), 2005, by New Zealand performer Savage, released again in 2008 featuring Soulja Boy
 "Swing" (Sofi Tukker song), 2019
 "The Swing" (song), 1997, by American country music artist James Bonamy
 "Swing, Swing", 2003, by the All-American Rejects
 "Swing", 1980, by Japan from the album Gentlemen Take Polaroids
 "Swing", 2015, by Knuckle Puck from the album Copacetic
 "Swing", 2012, by Parkway Drive from the album Atlas
 "Swing", 2014, by Super Junior-M from the album Swing
 "Swing", 1983, by Yello
 "Swing", 2019, by Brooke Candy from the album Sexorcism

Other uses in arts, entertainment, and media
 Swing (dance), a group of dances that correspond to swing style of jazz music
 Swing (musical), a 1999 Broadway musical
 Swing (video game), a 1997 video game for the PC and PlayStation
 Swing, an understudy in the musical theatre who prepares several roles
 The Swing (painting), a 1767 rococo painting by Jean-Honoré Fragonard

Politics
 Swing (politics), the extent of change in voter support
 Swing (Australian politics), refers to the extent of change in voter support, typically from one election or opinion poll to another
 Swing (United Kingdom), an indication of the scale of voter change between two political parties
 Captain Swing, a name appended to several threatening letters during the rural English Swing Riots of 1830

Sports
 Swing (boxing), a type of punch
 Baseball swing, the process of attempting to hit a ball with a bat in the game of baseball
 Golf swing or golf stroke mechanics, the means by which golfers analyze the execute their shots in the sport of golf
 Swing bowling, a subtype of fast bowling in cricket

Transportation
 Aquilair Swing, a French ultralight trike aircraft design
 S-Wing Swing, light sport aircraft designed and built in the Czech Republic
 Swing Bike, a bicycle where both front and rear wheels are steerable
 Swing Flugsportgeräte, German aircraft manufacturer

Other uses
 Swing (Java), a GUI widget toolkit for the Java programming language
 Swing (surname)
 Swing rifle, type of firearm
 Swing trading, when a tradable asset is held for one or more days to profit from price changes
 Swinging (sexual practice), when partners in a committed relationship engage in sexual activities with others

See also
 The Swing (disambiguation)
 Swings (disambiguation)
 Swinger (disambiguation)
 Swingin' (disambiguation)
 Pendulum (disambiguation)
 Swung dash